Phlox glaberrima (commonly called smooth phlox)  is a species of flowering plant in the phlox family. It is native to the Midwestern and Southeastern United States
where it is found in moist to wet areas. It can be found in both prairies and forests, where it is an indicator of high quality habitat.

The relationships between Phlox glaberrima, Phlox carolina, and Phlox maculata are particularly unclear. There may be hybridization, or an undescribed third species that resembles an intermediate. The phylogenetic relationships of this group of Phlox is currently under review.

References

glaberrima